Flentrop is a Dutch company based in Zaandam that builds and restores organs.

History
It was established in 1903 by Hendrik Wicher Flentrop (1866 -1950) from Koog aan de Zaan. Hendrik, originally a house painter by trade, was an organist at the Westzijderkerk in Zaandam, and started a piano- and organ trade. He believed that old organs could not be adapted to contemporary tastes, but had valid sound nonetheless. In 1915, after experience had been gained with restoration and extension of organs, the first new organ was built. Beginning in 1922 he corresponded with Albert Schweitzer, which resulted in pronounced opinions concerning the demands which had to be made on the organ.

Dirk Andries Flentrop (1910-2003), son of Hendrik Wicher Flentrop and Christina Anna Dekker, took control of the company in 1940. Important organs, such as that of Hans van Covelen in the large church at Alkmaar, and the Schnitger organs in the large church at Zwolle and the Laurenskerk in Alkmaar, were restored. In addition he built numerous instruments in the United States (most notably those in Adolphus Busch Hall at Harvard University, and in St. Mark's Cathedral, in Seattle, Washington), and restored two in Mexico City.

J. A. Steketee (b. 1936) led the company from 1976 to 1998. Under his direction, the organ of Johannes Duyschot in the Westzijderkerk at Zaandam was restored. Tasks were also carried out in foreign countries: Taipei, Riga, Tokyo, Dunblane, Kazan, and Yerevan. Additionally, the organ of the Holy Name Cathedral was built in Chicago, and in the Netherlands the organs of the Westerkerk and the Concertgebouw, and the St. John's Cathedral, were restored.

Cees van Oostenbrugge was managing director from  1998 until his death in 2008. During his tenure, a new restoration was carried out of the Hans van Covelen organ, which is the oldest playable organ of the Netherlands, originally built in 1511.

Frits Elshout was managing director from 2008 through 2016, followed by Erik Winkel.

All directors have also been church organists.

This article is based on that in the Dutch Wikipedia

References

Companies established in 1903
Musical instrument manufacturing companies of the Netherlands
Pipe organ building companies
Dutch brands
Zaanstad